Calclamna is an extinct genus of sea cucumber which existed in Europe during the Triassic and Jurassic period. The type species is Calclamna germanica.

References

Calclamnidae
Triassic animals of Europe
Triassic echinoderms
Fossils of Poland
Fossils of Germany
Middle Triassic first appearances
Early Jurassic extinctions
Jurassic animals of Europe
Jurassic echinoderms
Fossil taxa described in 1955